= Dandy Wellington =

Dandy Wellington is an American bandleader, event producer, and creative consultant. He is known for his "dandy" style, and popularizing the phrase "vintage style not vintage values".
